Corruption in Sweden has been defined as "the abuse of power" by Swedish National Council for Crime Prevention (Brå). By receiving bribes, bribe takers abuse their position of power, which is consistent with how the National Anti-Corruption Unit of the Swedish Prosecution Authority specifies the term. Although bribes and improper rewards are central in the definition of corruption in Sweden, corruption in the sense of "abuse of power" can also manifest itself in other crimes such as misuse of office, embezzlement, fraud and breach of trust against a principal.

Legal definition
The provisions on bribery and taking a bribe are found in Chapter 10 of the Swedish Penal Code. Bribe giving is the criminal act of giving, promising or offering or receiving, accepting a promise of or demanding an improper reward, for the performance of duties. Anything of direct or indirect value to the recipient can be considered an improper reward. The provisions on taking a bribe and giving a bribe are applicable both within the public and the private sector. They are also applicable on acts of bribery committed abroad or if the persons involved are foreign, provided that the acts of bribery are subject to the jurisdiction of Swedish courts.

Level of corruption
The level of corruption in Sweden is very low, according to a 2011 pan-European study by Transparency International. Transparency International's 2022 Corruption Perceptions Index scored Sweden at 83 on a scale from 0 ("highly corrupt") to 100 ("highly clean"). When ranked by score, Sweden ranked number 5 among the 180 countries in the Index, where the country ranked number 1 is perceived to have the most honest public sector.  The legal and institutional framework in Sweden are considered effective in fighting against corruption, and the government agencies are characterized by a high degree of transparency, integrity and accountability.

However, the OECD Working Group on Bribery has since 2012 repeatedly urged Sweden to reform its laws to ensure the investigation and prosecution of companies that bribe foreign public officials to obtain advantages in international business. This refers to the requirements of the OECD Convention on Combating Bribery of Foreign Public Officials in International Business Transactions.

There are municipal cases showing signs of irregular public procurement procedures between public and private actors. According to a case study of the Swedish Competition Authority consisting of judgments where corruption has occurred in connection with public procurement  the most common corruption situation is such that an official in a municipal administration or municipal company with close contact with suppliers receives a bribe during an ongoing contractual relation-ship. Of the proportion of convicted corruption convictions, 70 percent concern building and construction. However, the report sees high number of unrecorded procedures as likely.

The low levels of corruption are attributed to an efficient public administration, high quality comprehensive services to citizens and enterprises, and a long tradition of openness and transparency of Swedish society and institutions, along with a strong respect for the rule of law, according to an Anti-corruption European Commission report. According to the same report, The Special Eurobarometer on Corruption places Sweden among the countries with the least corruption in the EU. 40% of Swedish respondents believe that corruption is widespread in their country (EU average: 76%) and 12% feel personally affected by corruption in their daily life (EU average: 26%).

The number of cases reported, prosecuted and the number of convictions have been stable over time, according to a 2013 study by Brå. The study found that corruption in Sweden can mostly be described as being simple in nature, in that most cases involve smaller amounts, conference travel, dining and such.

Cases

TeliaSonera in Azerbaijan
The former Swedish agency Televerket, now a private company TeliaSonera is suspected of involvement in a corruption scandal in Azerbaijan, the Swedish newspaper Svenska Dagbladet reports. 
Corruption by proxy is the term used in these instances.

The Swedish Prison and Probation Service
The head of facilities management at The Swedish Prison and Probation Service was sentenced to 3.5 years in prison in what in 2016 was the largest corruption case involving a civil servant in Sweden.

See also
 Crime in Sweden

References

External links
Sweden Corruption Profile from the Business Anti-Corruption Portal
Motståndskraft, oberoende, integritet – kan det svenska samhället stå emot korruption? from Transparency International Sweden 

Sweden
Crime in Sweden by type
Politics of Sweden